Mount Wokomung is a sandstone tepui in the Pakaraima Mountains of western Guyana, the summit is 1700 metres. Together with Mount Ayanganna, 37 km to the north, 

Wokomung constitutes the easternmost tepui reaching above 1500 metres.

The slopes of Mount Wokomung are covered with medium-high canopy montane forest The summit of Wokomung is a shallow bowl with poor drainage. It supports low woody shrubs and terrestrial bromeliads.

Mount Wokomung supports some species which occur only on high tepuis in the Guiana Shield region

References

Mountains of Guyana
Tepuis of Guyana